Lava is molten volcanic rock or the resulting solid rock after cooling.

Lava or LAVA also refer to:

Films
Lava (1980 film), an Indian Malayalam action drama
Lava (1985 film), an Indian Hindi drama
Lava (2001 film), a British comedy
Lava (2014 film), a Pixar short

Music
Lava Records, an American record label
"Lava", a song from the album Filth Pig by American band Ministry
Lava (band), a Norwegian band

People
Lava (Ramayana), one of the sons of Rama and Sita, in Hindu religious scripture
William Lava (1911–1971), American composer
Benny Lava, an Indian character

Places
Lava, West Bengal, a town in Darjeeling, India
Lava Lake (British Columbia), in British Columbia, Canada
Lava Lake (Oregon), in Oregon, US
Lava (river), a coastal stream in Corse-du-Sud, France
Lava, Russia, a rural locality (a selo) in Sursky District of Ulyanovsk Oblast, Russia
Lava, Russian name of Łyna River which flows through Poland and Russia

Other uses
Lava (color), a shade of red, named after the color of volcanic lava
Lava International, an Indian electronics manufacturer
Lava (programming language)
Lava (soap), a hand cleaner
Lava shearwater, extinct seabird from the Canary Islands
LAVA (magazine), a triathlon periodical
Lava, former name of the UK music television channel Greatest Hits TV
Linaro Automated Validation
Laboratory for Visionary Architecture
Lesser Antilles Volcanic Arc, a chain of volcanoes and volcanic islands in the eastern Caribbean
Lava steatite, one of the names of soapstone

See also

Hot lava (game)
Lava flow (programming)
Lava lake
Lava lamp
Lavalava
 
Laava (disambiguation)
Larva (disambiguation)
Lavas (disambiguation)
Lawa (disambiguation)